The Cemetery Church of St. Petka  is a Serbian Orthodox church in Drsnik, in the municipality of Klina, Kosovo. It was built in the period from 1560 to 1570 and has been designated a cultural monument of exceptional importance. It was burned and damaged by the Albanians after the Kosovo War ended in 1999.

Architecture 
The graveyard church in Drsnik is a small church located in the centre of the village and dedicated to the Saint Petka (Saint Parascheva). The church is a single-nave building with a plinth of rough stone and a complex roof covered with stone slabs. Two narrow windows, one on the south wall, and the other on the apse, illuminate the interior. The frescoes have been preserved only on the lower surfaces and show a clear drawing, coloristic variety and a high technological level of work. The church has no historical data, but based on the quality of frescoes it dates from the seventies of the 16th century.

The destruction of the church in 1999 
In June 1999, after the arrival of the Italian KFOR troops, the church was burned and badly damaged by the Kosovo Albanians.

See also 
 Destroyed Serbian heritage in Kosovo

References

External links 
  
  Republic Institute for Protection of Cultural Monuments - Belgrade (Републички завод за заштиту споменика културе - Београд)
 List of monuments (Листа споменика)
 Official site of Serbian Orthodox Church (spc.rs, 10.07.2015)
 Base of immovable cultural property

Serbian Orthodox church buildings in Kosovo
Destroyed churches in Kosovo
Former Serbian Orthodox churches
16th-century Serbian Orthodox church buildings
Persecution of Serbs
Religious organizations established in the 1560s
1560 establishments in Europe
Klina
Cultural heritage of Kosovo
Cultural Monuments of Exceptional Importance (Serbia)